John Baptist Mickey (November 1876 – November 30, 1928) was an American Negro league outfielder between 1897 and 1907.

A native of Lexington, Virginia, Mickey played in the Negro leagues for the Cuban Giants in 1897 and for the Philadelphia Giants in 1907. He died in Harrisburg, Pennsylvania in 1928 at age 51 or 52.

References

External links
 and Seamheads

1876 births
1928 deaths
Cuban Giants players
Philadelphia Giants players
20th-century African-American people